Bardhec Ahmet Bytyqi (born 8 January 1997) is an Albanian professional footballer who plays as a left midfielder for Esbjerg fB.

Club career

Early career
Born in Nørresundby, Denmark, to Albanian parents, Bytyqi started  playing football with his hometown club Nørresundby, from where he moved to Nr. Uttrup & Bouet Idrætsforening (NUBI), before moving to the youth academy of AaB at age 8. Following impressive performances with under-19 where he scored also 1 goal, in July 2016, he was promoted to the AaB first team alongside six other youth players, including Joakim Mæhle and Magnus Christensen.

AaB
He made his senior debut for AaB on 7 September 2016 in a local match in the Danish Cup against his hometown club Nørresundby, playing the entire match in a 1–5 away win, assisting Thomas Enevoldsen's 2–0 goal in the first half. Meanwhile during the 2016–17 season he played 8 matches for the under-19 scoring also 6 goals. On 6 July 2017, it was announced that Bytyqi had signed a two-year contract extension, keeping him in Aalborg until 30 June 2019.

2017–18 season: Loan to Skive
In the 2017–18 season first-half, he was part of the team in 7 league matches and 1 cup match without playing any minute. Bytyqi was sent on a six-month loan to the second-tier 1st Division club Skive IK in January 2018, as Bytyqi had no prospect of first-team in AaB. He managed to make nine appearances and score a goal for Skive in the Danish 2nd Division in the spring of 2018. The one goal came on 17 April against FC Roskilde, described as a "dream goal".

2018–19 season
He returned to AaB in the summer of 2018 as his loan deal expired. He made his debut in the Danish Superliga on 27 August 2018, when he came on as a substitute in the 87th minute instead of Kristoffer Pallesen in a 0–1 defeat at home to Esbjerg fB. In addition to his Superliga debut, he made only one appearance in the autumn of 2018 on 26 September 2018 in a 0–5 away win over FC Roskilde in the Danish Cup.

Loan to Jammerbugt and subsequent permanent transfer
Due to lacking prospects of playing time in AaB in the spring of 2019, Bytyqi was loaned out to Jammerbugt FC in the 2nd Division for the rest of the season on 24 January 2019. He managed to score a goal on 13 April 2019 against Kjellerup which served to open the scoring but however wasn't enough as eventually the match was lost away 3–2. When the loan deal expired in the summer of 2019, he left AaB permanently at the end of the season, as his contract terminated.

Bytyqi continued on a permanent contract with Jammerbugt. Bytyqi played 4 matches during the 2019–20 Danish 2nd Divisions. In the next season 2020–21 he managed to score 10 goals in 7 matches in the 2020–21 Danish 2nd Divisions and 2 more goals in 3 cup matches to help his team in getting the promotion to the Danish 1st Division. In June 2021, Bytyqi signed a new one-year deal with Jammerbugt.

In the 2021–22 Danish 1st Division first half, he was an undisputed starter playing 15 consecutive full 90-minutes matches with 2 upcomings being substituted off in the second half and managing 3 goals.

Esbjerg
He moved to Esbjerg fB on 10 January 2022 for the second part of the season on a deal until the end of 2024, in order to help the team to avoid relegation. He was an unused substitute in the first match in February, but managed to play in all 3 matches of the March in where Esbjerg failed to score any goal taking only one goalless draw in which Bytyqi managed to play the full 90-minutes. Esbjerg was put in relegation group where played 10 more matches with Bytyqi mostly as a starter, but receiving lack of results collecting only 1 win and 5 draws relegating in the 2nd Division after finishing in the penultimate place of the ranking.

In the 2022–23 Danish 2nd Division he lost his starting place playing often as a substitute.

International career
Bytyqi was first called up for the Albania national U21 team by just appointed coach Alban Bushi for a gathering in Durrës, Albania from 18–25 January 2017. He was recalled two months later in two friendly matches against Moldova on 25 and 27 March 2017. In the second match played at Selman Stërmasi Stadium, Bytyqi scored in the second half of a match that Albania won 2–0 after a goal by Kristal Abazaj in the first half.

2019 UEFA European Under-21 Championship qualification
He was later called up for the friendly match against France U21 on 5 June 2017 and the 2019 UEFA European Under-21 Championship qualification Group 2 against Estonia on 12 June. The day before the friendly against France, however, he suffered an injury, causing him to miss both matches. On 22 August 2017 he received Albanian citizenship, thus becoming eligible to play also in the competitive matches. He was called up only in 2 matches of the 2019 UEFA Euro U-21 qualification Group 2 against Iceland on 10 October 2017 and Northern Ireland on 10 November 2017, being an unused substitute against the former and playing last minutes against the later which ended in a 1–1 home draw.

Career statistics

Club

References

External links
 
 

1997 births
Living people
People from Nørresundby
People from Aalborg Municipality
Sportspeople from the North Jutland Region
Danish men's footballers
Albanian footballers
Association football midfielders
Albania under-21 international footballers
AaB Fodbold players
Skive IK players
Jammerbugt FC players
Esbjerg fB players
Danish Superliga players
Danish 1st Division players
Danish 2nd Division players
Albanian expatriate footballers
Expatriate men's footballers in Denmark
Albanian expatriate sportspeople in Denmark
Danish people of Albanian descent